Kristjan Tamm (born 16 June 1998) is an Estonian tennis player.

Tamm has a career high ATP singles ranking of 625 achieved on 21 December 2020. He also has a career high ATP doubles ranking of 694, achieved on 31 May 2021. Tamm has won 2 ITF titles.
 
Tamm has represented Estonia at Davis Cup. In Davis Cup he has a win–loss record of 2–2.

Challenger and World Tennis Tour finals

Singles 4 (3–1)

Doubles 7 (1–6)

Davis Cup

Participations: (2–3)

   indicates the outcome of the Davis Cup match followed by the score, date, place of event, the zonal classification and its phase, and the court surface.

References

External links 
 
 
 
 

1998 births
Living people
Estonian male tennis players
Sportspeople from Tartu
21st-century Estonian people